"City of Dreams" is a 2013 song recorded by Swedish producer Alesso with Australian producer Dirty South. It features vocals from Ruben Haze.

Composition
City of Dreams is a progressive house song set in the key of E major with a tempo of 128 beats per minute.

Track listing
Digital download
 "City of Dreams (Radio Edit)" – 3:46
 "City of Dreams (Original Mix)" - 6:45
 "City of Dreams (Jacques Lu Cont Remix)" - 5:28
 "City of Dreams (Showtek Remix)" - 5:17

Charts

Weekly charts

Year-end charts

References

2013 singles
2013 songs
Alesso songs
Song recordings produced by Alesso
Songs written by Alesso